The 2009 Individual Speedway Junior World Championship was the 33rd edition of the FIM World motorcycle speedway Under-21 Championships.

The final took place on 4 October, 2009, in Goričan, Croatia. It was first final to be held in the Balkans and the Championship was won by Australian rider Darcy Ward.

Calendar

Domestic Qualifications 
Deutscher Motor Sport Bund nominated eight riders and two track reserve in February 2009.

Czech Republic 
Autoklub of the Czech Republic nominated five riders in October 2008: Filip Šitera, Matěj Kůs, Martin Gavenda, Michael Hádek and Jan Holub III. A sixth rider will be nominated in 2009.

Finland 

 Final
 18 April 2009
 Hallstavik
Referee: ?
Best time:
Attendance: ?

Poland 
32 riders to Domestic Semi-Finals was nominated by Main Commission of Speedway Sport. Semi-Finals took place on 17 April in Poznań and Rzeszów. The top eight riders from each Domestic Semi-Finals will qualify for the Domestic Final.

Qualifying rounds

Semi-finals

Final 
Final
 3 October 2009 (15:30)
 Goričan, Stadium Milenium (Length: 305 m)
Referee:  Marek Wojaczek
Jury President:  Armando Castagna
Changes:
No 11.  Przemysław Pawlicki → No 18. Wells
No 17.  Linus Eklöf → Tabaka

See also 
 2009 Team Speedway Junior World Championship
 2009 Speedway Grand Prix
 2009 Individual Speedway Junior European Championship

References 

2009
World Individual Junior
2009 in Croatian sport
Speedway competitions in Croatia